WGKY (95.9 FM) is a radio station broadcasting a sports format. Licensed to Wickliffe, Kentucky, United States, the station is owned by Dana Withers' Withers Broadcasting, through licensee Withers Broadcasting Company of Paducah, LLC, and features programming from Fox Sports Radio.

History
The station went on the air as WCRG on May 9, 1985. On October 2, 1986, the station changed its call sign to WYMC-FM; then on February 15, 1991, to the current WGKY.

On August 3, 2022, WGKY changed its format from oldies to sports, branded as "Fox Sports 95.9".

Previous logo

References

External links

GKY
Radio stations established in 1988
1988 establishments in Kentucky
Fox Sports Radio stations
Sports radio stations in the United States